Erickson Municipal Airport  is located adjacent to Erickson, Manitoba, Canada in the Rural Municipality of Clanwilliam.

References 

Registered aerodromes in Manitoba